Ameles kervillei is a species of praying mantis that lives in Syria.

References

kervillei
Insects described in 1911
Endemic fauna of Syria
Taxa named by Ignacio Bolívar